This is a list of football (soccer) clubs in Bahrain.

 Al-Ahli (Manama)
 Al Hadd Club
 Al Hala Club
 Al Ittifaq (Maqaba)
 Al-Ittihad (Bahrain)
 Al Kerlawi FC (Bahrain)
  Nexus Fc (Manama)
 Al Najma Club
 Al-Shabab Club
 Al Tadamun Buri
 Al Zad F.C
 Bahrain Club
 Bahrain Riffa Club
 Budaiya Club
 Busaiteen Club
 East Riffa Club
 Isa Town
 ISF FC (Bahrain)
 Malkiya Club
 Manama Club
 Muharraq Club
 Qalali Club
 Sitra Club

Bahrain
Football clubs
 
Football clubs